Pervasiveness generally refers to something being present in all parts of a particular thing or place, and is used as a term in:
 Pervasiveness doctrine
 Pervasive developmental disorder, emphasizing the affection of multiple basic functions affected